Sir Frederick William Johnston  (1872–1947) was a colonial administrator in British India.

Life
He was born in Cambuslang, Lanarkshire, the son of the Rev. Alexander Orrock Johnston, and was educated at Kelvinside Academy, the University of Glasgow, and Trinity Hall, Cambridge, graduating B.A. in 1894. He entered the Indian Civil Service in 1896.

He served as the Chief Commissioner of Balochistan in the 1920s during colonial rule, as well as the Chief Political Resident of the Persian Gulf.

References

Indian Civil Service (British India) officers
1947 deaths
1872 births
People from Cambuslang
People educated at Kelvinside Academy
Alumni of the University of Glasgow
Alumni of Trinity Hall, Cambridge
Companions of the Imperial Service Order
Companions of the Order of the Star of India
Knights Commander of the Order of the Indian Empire